The 1924–25 Kansas Jayhawks men's basketball team represented the University of Kansas during the 1924–25 college men's basketball season.

Roster
Tusten Ackerman
Wilferd Belgard
Clifford Campbell
Vernon Engel
Gale Gordon
Ward Hitt
Albert Peterson
Harold Schmidt
William Wilkin
Harold Zuber

Schedule

References

Kansas Jayhawks men's basketball seasons
Kansas
Kansas
Kansas